Uttarakhand has three main airports, a few airstrips and a couple of proposed airstrips for military and emergency purposes. The Dehradun Airport in Dehradun, Pantnagar Airport in Pantnagar, and Pithoragarh Airport in Pithoragarh are operated by the Airports Authority of India. Three airstrips, Chaukhutia Airport, Gauchar Airport and Chinyalisaur Airport are proposed for expansion in the future under UDAN scheme. 

Recently, a new terminal was constructed at Dehradun Airport. The new terminal was inaugurated in October 2021. In 2020, Uttarakhand's then Chief Minister Trivendra Singh Rawat had announced that the Pantnagar Airport will be expanded to become Uttarakhand's first international airport.

List
The list includes the airports in Uttarakhand with their respective ICAO and IATA codes.

References

Uttarakhand
Buildings and structures in Uttarakhand